Indianapolis 500 is a pinball machine designed by Dennis Nordman and produced by Midway (under the Bally brand name) released in June 1995. It is based on the sporting event of the same name.

Description
The three voices in the game are commentators Paul Page (longtime "Voice of the '500'"), and three-time Indy 500 winner Bobby Unser, and the announcer Tom Carnegie, who was a legend at the Indianapolis Motor Speedway for 50 years.

This game has no sink-holes and many targets and is one of the first pinball machines to feature light up targets. Such an object is a square plastic target, that is a little larger than one of the RIVER targets in White Water, or the REPAIR targets in Doctor Who and divided into four quadrants. Each quadrant can light up. The targets are completed if they are hit 4 times.

Digital versions
Indianapolis 500 was available as a licensed table of The Pinball Arcade for PC from July 1, 2016 to June 30, 2018.

References

External links
Internet Pinball Database entry for Indianapolis 500

1995 pinball machines
Bally pinball machines
IndyCar Series video games